Marija Šimanska (1922–1995) was a Latvian chemist of Polish heritage. She was one of the most prolific scientists of her era in Latvia and was honored with numerous medals and awards.

Biography
Marija Šimanska was born on 23 April 1922 Daugavpils, Latvia to Polish parents. She finished her high school studies in Polish in 1940 at the Daugavpils Gymnasium and enrolled in the University of Latvia. After only one semester in the pharmacy school, she left Riga and returned to Daugavpils to join the Polish underground. She was arrested and sent to the Stutthof concentration camp in February 1943. At the end of the war in 1945, she returned to school and completed her degree in chemistry in 1948. She went to work in the Forestry Problems Institute and simultaneously studied for her PhD. When she received her doctorate in 1952, she became one of the first three Soviet women to have attained a doctorate in chemistry.

Between 1957 and 1975 she was the deputy director of the Institute of Organic Synthesis and she founded the catalytic synthesis lab there, where she researched heterocyclic compounds and catalytic transformations. She developed many new catalysts, analytical reagents, and medical processes and was one of the most prolific scientists of Latvia. Šimanska published over 450 research papers and was the creator of 56 inventions. She also served as the editor of Latvijas Ķīmijas Žurnāls (Latvian Chemical Journal) of the Latvian Academy of Sciences and Latvijas Farmaceitu Žurnāls (Latvian Pharmaceutical journal). Šimanska also served as the president of the Latvian Pharmacists' Scientific Society from 1978 to 1994.

During her career, she received recognition for her work, including the Latvian Soviet Socialist Republic State Laureate Prize in 1965; the David Hieronymus Grindel Medal; the  Medal; and the  Medal. In 1992, she was made the President of the Latvian Union of Poles and that same year was made an honorary member of the Latvian Academy of Sciences. Posthumously, she was awarded the Gustavs Vanags Laureate Prize and diploma for her research on Non-traditional methods of catalytic chemistry of heterocyclic compounds.

She died on 10 July 1995 in Riga and was buried in the Daugavpils Catholic cemetery.

Selected works

References

Bibliography

External links
WorldCat Publications
WorldCat Publications
WorldCat Publications
WorldCat Publications

1922 births
1995 deaths
Latvian chemists
20th-century Latvian inventors
Latvian women chemists
Latvian women scientists
20th-century women scientists
Scientists from Daugavpils
Latvian people of Polish descent
University of Latvia alumni
Women inventors
Soviet women chemists
Soviet chemists
Soviet people of Polish descent